The , signed as Route K5, is one of the tolled routes of the Shuto Expressway system serving the Greater Tokyo Area and is one of seven of the routes in the system serving Kanagawa Prefecture.

Junction list
The entire expressway lies within Yokohama in Kanagawa Prefecture

References

External links

K5
1989 establishments in Japan
Roads in Kanagawa Prefecture